Cernik is a village and a municipality in the Brod-Posavina County. According to the 2011 census, there are a total of 3,640 inhabitants in the area. It was ruled by the Ottoman Empire between 1536 and 1691 and was the ultimate centre of the Sanjak of Pakrac until the Austrian conquest.

There are 11 settlements in the municipality:

 Baćin Dol – 381
 Banićevac – 223
 Cernik – 1,607
 Giletinci – 268
 Golobrdac – 0
 Opatovac – 332
 Opršinac – 0
 Podvrško – 294
 Sinlije – 0
 Šagovina Cernička – 312
 Šumetlica – 223

References

External links

http://cernik.atspace.com/Uvodna.htm
http://flagspot.net/flags/hr-sb-ce.html

Municipalities of Croatia
Populated places in Brod-Posavina County